Victor Kirchen (9 June 1898 – 5 September 1970) was a Luxembourgian racing cyclist. He rode in the 1925 Tour de France.

References

1898 births
1970 deaths
Luxembourgian male cyclists
Place of birth missing